The Tsing-ling pika (Ochotona syrinx) is a species of pika endemic to the mountains in Central China. It inhabits mountainous forests and shrublands. It is a poorly known species.

It is a rarely found, one of the six pika species endemic to central China, although the taxonomy of these is in flux, with no true population studies.

References

Notes

Bibliography

Further reading

Pikas
Mammals of China
Endemic fauna of China
Mammals described in 1908
Taxa named by Paul Matschie